Kelabit is one of the most remote languages of Borneo, on the Sarawak–North Kalimantan border. It is spoken by one of the smallest ethnicities in Borneo, the Kelabit people.

Phonology
All consonants but the aspirated voiced stops are lengthened after stressed . Stress generally occurs on the penultimate syllable. 

Kelabit is notable for having "a typologically rare series of true voiced aspirates" (that is, not breathy voice/murmured consonants; for some speakers they are prevoiced) along with modally voiced and tenuis consonants but without an accompanying series of voiceless aspirates. It is the only language known to have voiced aspirates or murmured consonants without also having voiceless aspirated consonants, a situation that has been reconstructed for Proto-Indo-European.

At the end of a word,  is pronounced . For some speakers,  is affricated; in neighboring Lun Dayeh, the reflex of this consonant is an unaspirated affricate .  is rare, and is not attested from all dialects.

The flap is alveolar. It's not clear if  and the other coronal sonorants are alveolar like  or dental like .

The aspirated voiced series only occurs intervocalically, and may have arisen from geminate consonants. They are at least impressionistically twice as long as other stops. They vary with  under suffixation, with  occurring where other consonants would be allophonically geminated:
 'to fell' >  'fell it!'
 'back (n)' >  'to be left behind'

There are several arguments for analyzing the aspirated voiced consonants as segments rather than as consonant clusters:
There are no (other) clusters allowed in the language. Some languages allow only geminate consonants as clusters, but there are no (other) phonemic geminates in Kelabit. In some related languages, such as Ida'an, the reflexes of these sounds clearly do behave as clusters. 
The syllable break occurs before the consonants (that is, and not in the middle, which is the behaviour of consonant clusters (including geminates) in related languages that allow them.  lower to  before any non-glottal coda consonant. They do not lower before the aspirated voiced consonants, again suggesting they are not consonant clusters.

The aspirated voiced series does not appear in all dialects of Kelabit or Lun Dayeh:

References

Bibliography 
 Asmah Haji Omar (1983). The Malay Peoples of Malaysia and Their Languages. Kuala Lumpur: Art Printing Works.
 Blust, Robert (1974). The Proto-North Sarawak vowel deletion hypothesis. PhD Dissertation, University of Hawai‘i at Manoa.
 Blust, Robert (1993). ‘Kelabit-English vocabulary’. Sarawak Museum Journal 44 (65): 141‑226.
 Blust, Robert (2006). ‘The Origin of the Kelabit Voiced Aspirates: A Historical Hypothesis Revisited’. Oceanic Linguistics 45 (2): 311-338.
 Blust, Robert (2016). Kelabit-Lun Dayeh Phonology, with Special Reference to the Voiced Aspirates. Oceanic Linguistics 55 (1): 246-277.
 Bolang, Alexander & Tom Harrisson (1949). ‘Murut and related vocabularies with  special reference to North Borneo terminology’. Sarawak Museum Journal 5: 116-124
Douglas, R. S. (1911). ‘A comparative vocabulary of the Kayan, Kenyan and Kelabit dialects’. Sarawak Museum Journal 1 (1): 75-119.
Galih, Balang (1965). Kapah Ayo’ Tana’ Inih Pangah Penudut Guma Nepeled. How the World was Made by Guma Nepeled: A Kelabit-Murut Story. The Sarawak Gazette, May 31, 152.
 Hemmings, Charlotte (2015). Kelabit Voice: Philippine-Type, Indonesian-Type or Something a Bit Different? Transactions of the Philological Society 113(3): 383-405.
 Hemmings, Charlotte (2016). The Kelabit Language, Austronesian Voice and Syntactic Typology. PhD Dissertation, Department of Linguistics, SOAS, University of London. 
 Martin, Peter W (1996). A Comparative Ethnolinguistic Survey of the Murut (Lun Bawang) with Special Reference to Brunei. In Peter W. Martin, Conrad Oz̊óg & Gloria Poedjosoedarmo (eds.), Language Use and Language Change in Brunei Darussalam, 268-279. Athens, OH: Ohio University Press.
Martin, Peter W. & Eileen Yen (1994). Language use among the Kelabit living in urban centres. In Peter W. Martin (ed.), Shifting Patterns of Language Use in Borneo, 147 163. Williamsburg VA: Borneo Research Council.

External links
 ELAR archive of Kelabit language documentation materials
 Kaipuleohone archive of Robert Blust's materials include notes on Kelabit.

Apo Duat languages
Languages of Indonesia
Languages of Malaysia